Acacia longifolia is a species of Acacia native to southeastern Australia, from the extreme southeast of Queensland, eastern New South Wales, eastern and southern Victoria, and southeastern South Australia. Common names for it include long-leaved wattle, acacia trinervis, aroma doble, golden wattle, coast wattle, sallow wattle and Sydney golden wattle. It is not listed as being a threatened species, and is considered invasive in Portugal, New Zealand and South Africa. In the southern region of Western Australia, it has become naturalised and has been classed as a weed by out-competing indigenous species. It is a tree that grows very quickly reaching 7–10 m in five to six years.

Description
It has smooth to finely fissured greyish coloured bark and glabrous branchlets that are angled towards the apices. Like most species of Acacia it has phyllodes rather than true leaves. The cylindrical flower-spikes have a length of  packed with bright to pale yellow coloured flowers. Following flowering thinly leathery to firmly papery seed pods form that are straight to strongly twisted and raised over and constricted between each of the seeds.

Taxonomy 
The species was first formally described by Henry Cranke Andrews in 1802 as Mimosa longifolia in The Botanist's Repository for New, and Rare Plants then in 1806 as Acacia longifolia in the Carl Ludwig Willdenow publication Species Plantarum. It was reclassified as Racosperma longifolium in 1987 by Leslie Pedley then transferred back to genus Acacia in 2006. Other synonyms include Mimosa macrostachya and Phyllodoce longifolia.

The specific epithet refers to the long phyllodes on this species.

There are two recognised subspecies:
Acacia longifolia subsp. longifolia
Acacia longifolia subsp. sophorae (Labill.) Court

Distribution
The species is endemic to coastal area of south eastern Queensland close to the border with New South Wales extending southward down the coast of New South Wales. In New South Wales it is common along the tablelands and coastal areas where it is situated in various habitats including foredunes and is usually a part of sclerophyll  woodland or coastal heath and scrub communities. The range then extends south and east through Victoria and into South Australia. In South Australia it is found on the Eyre Peninsula, Yorke Peninsula, Kangaroo Island, southern Lofty Ranges and throughout the south eastern region where it is mostly restricted to sand dunes.

It has become naturalised in the south west of Western Australia in coastal areas extending from around Perth in the north down to around Albany in the south. It is thought to have introduced by escaping from gardens and being used in restoration plantings. Control methods include hand pulling seedlings and ringbarking or using glyphosate on older plants.

Uses 
Acacia longifolia is widely cultivated in subtropical regions of the world. Its uses include prevention of soil erosion, food (flowers, seeds and seed pods), yellow dye (from the flowers), green dye (pods) and wood. The flower colour derives from the organic compound kaempferol. The tree's bark has limited use in tanning, primarily for sheepskin. It is useful for securing uninhabited sand in coastal areas, primarily where there are not too many hard frosts. In Tasmania the ripening pods were roasted and the seeds removed and eaten.

Cultivation
The shrub is available commercially and can be propagated by seed scarification or boiling water treatment.
It is regarded as an attractive, hardy, fast-growing species suitable as a hedge plant or for screening. Suitable for hydroseeding work on banks where it will provide soil stabilization. Sydney golden wattle is well suited for low maintenance areas such as road batters, will grow in a range of soil types and is frost hardy. It is heavily used at present in Southern California as a street canopy tree, as it grows fairly quickly (reaching a height of five meters within a year or two of planting), tolerates drought, and is resilient even to the particularly brutal pruning practices associated with low-cost tree services.

In Portugal the species is considered highly invasive in sand dunes and its cultivation is prohibited by law.

Control
In South Africa at least, the Pteromalid wasp Trichilogaster acaciaelongifoliae has been introduced from Australia, and has spread rapidly, achieving substantial control. The effect on the trees has been described as drastic seed reduction (typically over 90%) by galling of reproductive buds, and indirect debilitation of the affected plant by increased abscission of inflorescences adjacent to the growing galls. The presence of galls also caused leaf abscission, reducing vegetative growth as well as reproductive output.

Phytochemistry
N-(2-imidazol-4-yl-ethyl)-trans-cinnamamide
N-(2-imidazol-4-yl-ethyl)-deca-trans-2, cis-4-dienamide
 dimethyltryptamine 0.2–0.3%, histamine

Gallery

See also
 List of Acacia species

References 

longifolia
Fabales of Australia
Flora of New South Wales
Flora of Queensland
Flora of South Australia
Flora of Victoria (Australia)
Plants described in 1806
Taxa named by Carl Ludwig Willdenow
Taxa named by Henry Cranke Andrews